Peter Austin Berry (27 April 1935 – 26 May 2018) was an Anglican clergyman who served as the Provost of Birmingham Cathedral. He was educated at Solihull School and Keble College, Oxford. Ordained in 1963 he began his career as Chaplain to the Bishop of Coventry and was then successively Midlands Regional Officer to the Community Relations Communion and a Canon Residentiary at  Coventry Cathedral  before his 13-year stint at Birmingham Cathedral.

Notes

1935 births
2018 deaths
Alumni of Keble College, Oxford
People educated at Solihull School
Provosts and Deans of Birmingham